Wyoming High School is a public high school located in Wyoming, Michigan and is part of the Wyoming Public Schools District in Kent County, Michigan. Wyoming High School was formed from the combination of Wyoming Park High School and Rogers High School

Football
The Wyoming Wolves high school football team was started in 2012. In nine seasons, from 2012 to 2020, they have had an overall losing record of 23–54. They had two winning seasons, in 2012 and 2016 both in which they went 5–4. They have had one playoff appearance, in 2020, and they played Mona Shores High School. The Wolves lost 6-54 and Mona Shores went on to win the state championship against De La Salle Collegiate High School.

Basketball
Wyoming has a strong history of basketball success. They have won 3 conference championships, and in 2020 were the co-state champs during a season shortened by the COVID-19 pandemic. The year the school was founded (2012), the Wolves basketball team went 10-11, and were and academic all-state, with an average GPA of 3.2. Coach VanderKlay has coached the team since 1986, and has had 30 out of his 35 teams end up top 3 in the conference.

References

External links
School website
Michigan High School Football
Official Page of Wyoming Basketball

2012 establishments in Michigan
Educational institutions established in 2012
Public high schools in Michigan
Schools in Kent County, Michigan